Langage may refer to:

 Langage, Devon, a settlement in England
 Langage Power Station
 langage, a French word for language as a general phenomenon, or to the human ability to have language (see Langue and parole)